Sebusiso Keketsi (born 4 April 1981) is a Lesotho male light flyweight boxer. He competed at the 2000 Summer Olympics in the men's light flyweight event.

Sebusiso is currently working as a boxing coach in Lesotho.

References 

1981 births
Living people
Lesotho male boxers
Boxers at the 2000 Summer Olympics
Olympic boxers of Lesotho
African Games medalists in boxing
African Games bronze medalists for Lesotho
Light-flyweight boxers
Competitors at the 1999 All-Africa Games